The Official Secretary to the Governor of New South Wales and his staff, as part of the Office of the Governor, provide governors with the necessary support to enable them to carry out their constitutional, statutory, ceremonial and public duties. The position of Official Secretary was established on 1 December 1905, replacing the previous position of the Clerk to the Private Secretary to the Governor. From time to time the Governor has also appointed a private secretary, operating alongside the Official Secretary. The Official Secretary, as the head of the Office of the Governor, is an executive-level officer of the Department of Premier and Cabinet, and is the Chief of Staff of Government House. This office is funded through the annual budget, as is the governor's salary.

The support provided by the Office of the Governor includes the organisation of, and advice relating to, their duties, hospitality for official functions, and administration of the Australian honours and Awards system. The Official Secretary is ex-officio Secretary of the Executive Council of New South Wales and NSW's nominee to serve on the Council for the Order of Australia. The Official Secretary is supported in his role by a Deputy Official Secretary and program managers responsible for the Government House Estate, Household and Protocol.

The current Official Secretary is Colonel Michael Miller RFD, who succeeded Brian Davies in March 2015. Miller had previously served Governors Gordon Samuels and Marie Bashir as an Honorary Aide-de-Camp (ADC) from May 1996 to June 2001 and was awarded the Centenary Medal for his service to the Governor. The Deputy Official Secretary is Christopher Sullivan since 4 November 2013.

Office-holders

Clerk to the Private Secretary

Official Secretaries

Private Secretaries

See also
 Official Secretary to the Governor-General of New Zealand
 Official Secretary to the Governor-General of Australia

References

External links
 Official Secretary to the Governor

Public servants of New South Wales
Government agencies of New South Wales
Official Secretary